Theodore Michel Mavrogordato (31 July 1883 – 24 August 1941) was a tennis player from Great Britain who was active during the first decades of the 20th century.

Career
Mavrogordato represented Oxford University in the 1904 and 1905 Oxford v. Cambridge matches.

He played his first Wimbledon singles' competition in 1904 and lost in the first round to Frederick Payn. In 1907 he reached the final of the All England Plate but was beaten by George Hillyard in two straight sets. His best achievement in the Wimbledon singles event was reaching the semi-final of the All-Comers tournament on three occasions. The first time was in 1909 when he lost in four sets to Major Ritchie. His second semi-final appearance came in 1914 and this time he lost in straight sets to German Otto Froitzheim. His last semi-final came in 1920, eleven years after the first, after defeating two–time U.S Championship winner R. Norris Williams in the quarterfinal. This time Japanese Zenzo Shimizu proved too strong. Over the following years he would make regular appearances at Wimbledon until his final participation in 1928.

He participated in the 1912 Olympic Games in Stockholm and played in the indoor tournament. In the mixed doubles event he reached the second round with his partner, and future wife, Mabel Parton. In the singles and men's doubles event he lost in the first round.

Mavrogodato played for the British Davis Cup team in 1914 and won all his singles matches in the quarter- and semi-final. In the final against Australasia he only played the doubles match together with his partner James Cecil Parke which they lost to Norman Brookes and Anthony Wilding. In 1919, after World War I, he played in the semi-final against South Africa and won his single match against Louis Raymond. He lost his second match, a dead rubber, against George Dodd.

Between 1905 and 1913 he won five titles at the Welsh Covered Court Championships. In 1909 Mavrogordato won the Scottish Championships. In 1912 he reached the final of the Northern Championships in Liverpool which he lost to J.C. Parke. In 1914 he won the doubles title at the British Covered Court Championships. Together with P.M. Davson they beat P. Hicks and W. Ingram in the final. Seven years later, in 1921, he again won the doubles title, this time partnering with P.M. Davson. In October 1919 he won the singles title of the London Covered Court Championships defeating Ritchie in the final.

During World War I Mavrogordato served in the Army Service Corps and was ranked a captain and later a major. From 1928 until his death in 1941 he was chairman of the All England Lawn Tennis Ground Company.

Playing style
In his book The Art of Lawn Tennis, Bill Tilden describes Mavrogordato's playing style: "His game is steadiness personified. He shoves his service in the court at the end of a prodigious swing that ends in a poke. It goes where he wishes it. His ground strokes are fine, in splendid form, very accurate and remarkably fast for so little effort. Mavro is not large enough to hit hard, but owing to his remarkable footwork, he covers a very large territory in a remarkably short space of time. His racquet work is a delight to a student of orthodox form. His volleying is accurate, steady, well placed but defensive. He has no speed or punch to his volley. His overhead is steady to the point of being unique. He is so small that it seems as if anyone could lob over his head, but his speed of foot is so great that he invariably gets his racquet on it and puts it back deep. Mavro turns defence into attack by putting the ball back in play so often that his opponent gets tired hitting it and takes unnecessary chances. His accuracy is so great that it makes up for his lack of speed. His judgment is sound but not brilliant. He is a hard-working, conscientious player who deserves his success."

Notes

References

External links
 

1883 births
1941 deaths
English male tennis players
English people of Greek descent
Olympic tennis players of Great Britain
Tennis players at the 1912 Summer Olympics
Tennis people from Greater London
British male tennis players
British Army personnel of World War I
Royal Army Service Corps officers